Plaisance is a station on line Line 13 of the Paris Métro in the 14th arrondissement.

The station opened on 21 January 1937 as part of the original line 14 between Bienvenüe and Porte de Vanves. This line became part of line 13 on 9 November 1976.
The station is named after the Château du Maine which was built in the 17th century and possessed an immense park. The word "plaisance" is equivalent to the English "pleasance", that is a pleasure garden. It was purchased in 1842 by a surveyor called Couesnon whose son subdivided it, creating the district of Plaisance between 1858 and 1860, which became one of the largest slums of Paris. The Compagnie générale des omnibus (a major 19th century operator of horse buses and later trams and motor buses) razed the castle to build garages.

Station layout

References
Roland, Gérard (2003). Stations de métro. D’Abbesses à Wagram. Éditions Bonneton.

Paris Métro stations in the 14th arrondissement of Paris
Railway stations in France opened in 1937